All Soul is an album by jazz organist Johnny "Hammond" Smith recorded for the New Jazz label in 1959.

Reception

Stewart Mason in his review for Allmusic stated, "Smith would go on to make better albums, but All Soul is a promising debut".

Track listing
All compositions by Johnny "Hammond" Smith except where noted.

 " Goin' Places" – 6:49  
 "Sweet Cookies" – 6:34  
 "The Masquerade is Over" (Herb Magidson, Allie Wrubel) – 4:42  
 "Pennies from Heaven" (Johnny Burke, Arthur Johnston) – 4:35  
 "Easy Like" – 7:30  
 "Secret Love" (Sammy Fain, Paul Francis Webster) – 4:30  
 "All Soul" (Curtis Lewis) – 4:16

Personnel
Johnny "Hammond" Smith – organ
Thornel Schwartz – guitar
George Tucker – bass 
Leo Stevens – drums

Production
 Esmond Edwards – producer
 Rudy Van Gelder – engineer

References

Johnny "Hammond" Smith albums
1959 albums
New Jazz Records albums
Albums produced by Esmond Edwards
Albums recorded at Van Gelder Studio